Ward Body Works (also known as Ward Industries and Ward School Bus Manufacturing, Inc.) was an American bus manufacturer.  Headquartered in Conway, Arkansas, Ward specialized in yellow school buses, alongside buses for other uses.  Founded in 1933 by D.H. "Dave" Ward, the company was family-owned for nearly its entire existence.

Among several innovations, Ward was the first manufacturer to perform a rollover test on a school bus, leading to changes in school bus body design.  In another industry first, Ward was the first manufacturer to assemble buses on an assembly line.  

In 1980, Ward filed for bankruptcy and was reorganized as American Transportation Corporation (AmTran), keeping the Ward brand name in use on school buses.  In 1991, AmTran was acquired by Navistar International, leaving to the retirement of the Ward brand name during 1992.  The company currently exists as the IC Bus subsidiary of Navistar (the successor of AmTran).

History

1933-1945 
D. H. "Dave" Ward founded Ward Body Works in Conway, Arkansas, in 1933 when he "lowered the roof of a wooden bus for Mr. Carl Brady of the Southside Schools". Southside Schools were located about 15 miles north of Conway.  A blacksmith by trade, Ward grew his business primarily on body repair of bus bodies in the area.  In 1936, he built his first complete school bus body.  One of the first manufacturers of the time to use all-metal construction, the first school bus made by Ward Body Works featured removable safety-glass windows and perimeter and center-mounted seating.

In 1939, the company opened a 10,000 square-foot factory in Conway, Arkansas.  During World War II, along with supplying buses for the military, Ward built over 1000 different bodies of various types for the GMC CCKW cargo truck.

1945-1950s 
Following the war, the company became one of the first bus manufacturers to expand outside of the United States, opening a facility in Mexico City in 1947; bus bodies from Conway would be shipped to Mexico to be placed on chassis for use internationally.  To expand capacity inside the United States, a second facility was opened in Austin, Texas in 1951.

Despite expanding to 100,000 square feet, the original Ward factory in Conway was too small to keep up with demand; the company built an even larger factory outside of the city in 1954; at any given time, 45 bus bodies could be on the 1,500-foot-long assembly line, producing up to 100 complete buses weekly.  Later in the 1950s, the company moved beyond its school bus roots, adding mass-transit and sightseeing buses to its product lineup.  Due to importation issues, the Ward factory in Mexico was closed in 1954.

In 1956, Ward became both a body manufacturer and an industry supplier, as the company created a subsidiary, C.S. Sash Company, which became a major aluminum window frame manufacturer for school buses.

1960s 
In the 1960s, Ward School Bus Manufacturing, Inc. began a series of updates that would modernize manufacturing and production.  To catalog the various state and local regulations affecting school bus specifications, in 1964, company owner Charles Ward set up a computer mainframe (using IBM 360s).  In the same year, Ward performed the first independent rollover test on a school bus, discovering issues related to structural integrity.  During 1967, the assembly line in the Conway facility was upgraded to a moving assembly line, a first in the bus industry.  In 1969, the recommendations from the crash test were published, finding that an inconsistent number of fasteners among manufacturers could lead to poor joint strength.  The findings would be used in part to government recommendations for school bus joint strength.  Following the 1968 retirement of Dave Ward, Ward Body Works remained a family-owned company, with son Charles Ward handling operations.

1970s 
During the 1970s, Ward would become one of the largest school bus body manufacturers in the United States, with the company holding a 25% market share in 1973.  In 1970, the Austin plant was replaced by an all-new facility in Beaver Falls, Pennsylvania.  To expand into small buses, Ward purchased Texas-based manufacturer Coachette in 1973, moving their production into a separate facility in Conway.  Additionally, the assembly line at the main Conway facility was upgraded and connected to an IBM 370 mainframe, as the company explored computer-based manufacturing.  Coinciding with the new assembly line was the redesigned full-size conventional bus body, dubbed the Ward Volunteer.  Aside from a redesigned windshield and the change in chassis suppliers, the Ward Volunteer shares many components with that of the IC Bus CE-Series produced today.

In 1976, Ward produced a prototype for the first full-size school bus with front-wheel drive, but the company was forced to abandon the project before producing the vehicle.

Company closure 
Along with other school bus manufacturers, the late 1970s would prove to be a rough time for Ward, which had been renamed Ward School Bus Manufacturing, Inc.  In 1975, the Pennsylvania plant was forced to close.  As Ward faced declining demand for school buses, the company was over $20 million in debt; in July 1980, the company filed for Chapter 11 bankruptcy.

In August 1980, an investment group assisted by the then-Arkansas Governor Bill Clinton purchased the assets of Ward Industries; the only interests that the Ward family would keep in the new company would be in vehicle distribution.  Though producing buses in the former Ward factory in Conway, the new company was officially known as American Transportation Corporation (AmTran), with school buses continuing the Ward brand name.  

During the 1980s, AmTran expanded the Ward product line. In 1985, the Patriot semi-forward control bus and the Vanguard cutaway-van bus were added; in 1990, the front-engine Senator replaced the long-running President model line.

Products

See also

AmTran - direct successor
IC Bus - successor to AmTran

References

External links
Article with information about Ward Body Works foundation 
Article with facts related to Ward bankruptcy filing

Navistar International
School bus manufacturers
1933 establishments in Arkansas
Bus manufacturers of the United States